Ankhmare  was an ancient Egyptian prince and vizier of the 4th Dynasty. His titles include king's eldest son of his body (sA-nswt n Xt=f), as well as chief justice and vizier (smsw tAjtj sAb TAtj). Ankhmare was a son of Pharaoh Khafre and was named after the god Ra.

Titles
His titles include: 
 Hereditary prince, count, the eldest King's son of his body
 Chief Ritualist of His Father
 Chief justice and vizier
 Treasurer of his father, the King of Lower Egypt.

Tomb
Ankhmare's tomb is G 8460, located in the Central Field, which is part of the Giza Necropolis. The entrance leads to a rock-cut chapel. Two pillars divide the chapel into two parts. In the area behind the pillars three burial shafts are dug into the floor.
 Shaft no 1350 contained a skeleton. Foot prints of a man and a boy were found in the area around the body. These presumably belonged to the grave robbers who violated the burial chamber in antiquity.
 Shaft no 1351 was a simple pit.
 Shaft no 1352 contained a limestone sarcophagus which was placed against the west wall.

Sources

Princes of the Fourth Dynasty of Egypt
Viziers of the Fourth Dynasty of Egypt
Khafre